C. niger may refer to:
 Cephalophus niger, the black duiker, a forest dwelling mammal species found in the southern parts of Sierra Leone, Liberia, Côte d'Ivoire, Ghana, Benin and Nigeria
 Chelonoidis niger, The Galápagos tortoise or Galápagos giant tortoise (Chelonoidis niger) is a species of very large tortoise in the genus Chelonoidis 
 Chiloglanis niger, a catfish species
 Chlidonias niger, the black tern, a small tern generally found in or near inland water in Europe and North America
 Chrysops niger, a fly species
 Cyperus niger, the black flatsedge, a plant species native to the Americas
 Canis niger is an invalid taxon that used to refer to Canis rufus, also known as the Red Wolf.

See also
 Niger (disambiguation)